The elephant clock was a model of water clock invented by the medieval Islamic engineer Ismail al-Jazari (1136–1206). Its design was detailed in his book, The Book of Knowledge of Ingenious Mechanical Devices.

Representation of multiculturality
Upon finishing the development and construction of his elephant clock, Al-Jazari wrote: "The elephant represents the Indian and African cultures, the two dragons represent Chinese culture, the phoenix represents Persian culture, the water work represents Greek culture, and the turban represents Islamic culture," expressing his multicultural mentality.

Mechanism 

The timing mechanism is based on a water-filled basin hidden inside the elephant. In the bucket is a deep bowl floating in the water, but with a small hole in the centre. The bowl takes half an hour to fill through this hole. In the process of sinking, the bowl pulls a string attached to a see-saw mechanism in the tower on top of the elephant. This releases a ball that drops into the mouth of a serpent, causing the serpent to tip forward, which pulls the sunken bowl out of the water via strings. At the same time, a system of strings causes a figure in the tower to raise either the left or right hand and the mahout (elephant driver at the front) to hit a drum. This indicates a half or full hour. Next, the snake tips back. The cycle then repeats, as long as balls remain in the upper reservoir to power the emptying of the bowl.

Automaton 
In the mechanism, a humanoid automaton strikes the cymbal and a mechanical bird chirps, as in the later cuckoo clock.

Passage of temporal hours 
Another innovative feature of the clock was how it recorded the passage of temporal hours, which meant that the rate of flow had to be changed daily to match the uneven length of days throughout the year. To accomplish this, the clock had two tanks. The top tank was connected to the time-indicating mechanisms and the bottom was connected to the flow control regulator. At daybreak, the tap was opened and water flowed from the top tank to the bottom tank via a float regulator that maintained a constant pressure in the receiving tank.

Modern reproductions 
Several modern reproductions of the Elephant Clock have been created by the 1001 Inventions organization. These reproductions are featured as part of the 1001 Inventions educational science shows that have been touring around the world since 2006. During a visit to the London Science Museum in January 2010, BBC journalist Nick Higham described the five metre high, working Elephant Clock replica produced by 1001 Inventions as "spectacular".

A modern full-size working reproduction can be found as a centerpiece in the Ibn Battuta Mall, a shopping mall in Dubai, United Arab Emirates.  Another working reproduction can be seen outside the Musée d'Horlogerie du Locle, Château des Monts, in Le Locle, Switzerland. Another can be found in the Museum of Science and Technology in Islam in the King Abdullah University of Science and Technology in Saudi Arabia.

See also 
 Inventions in the Muslim world
 Dar al-Magana
 Dar al-Muwaqqit

References

External links 

 Article including a photograph of the Ibn Battuta Mall elephant clock.
 Information from the Metropolitan Museum, New York.
 Saudi Aramco World: The Third Dimension by Richard Covington, including Dr Fuat Sezgin, his museum of Arabic–Islamic science in Frankfurt, and in particular a model of the elephant clock.
 

Water clocks
Technology in the medieval Islamic world
Tourist attractions in Dubai
Historical robots